Monica Ulmanu is a Romanian journalist and graphics editor. She has worked as a graphics editor for The Washington Post since 2018, where she has speciallised in working on climate and health-related topics.

She graduated from the University of Bucharest, and then received a Fulbright award in 2008. She completed her studies with a master's degree in visual communication at the Hussman School of Journalism and Media, University of North Carolina at Chapel Hill. She has also worked as a visual journalist for other media outlets such as The Guardian, Reuters, The Boston Globe, and The New York Times.

In 2020 she was part of the team who won a Pulitzer prize for the "2C: Beyond the Limit", covering the risk of temperature increase in planet earth. She has also won other design awards, such as the Malofiej Infographics Awards and the European Digital Media Awards, among others.

References 

Romanian women journalists
The Washington Post people
21st-century Romanian women
University of North Carolina alumni
University of Bucharest alumni
Year of birth missing (living people)
Living people